Helichrysum suffruticosum is a species of flowering plant in the family Asteraceae.
It is found only in Yemen.
Its natural habitat is subtropical or tropical dry forests.

References

suffruticosum
Endemic flora of Socotra
Vulnerable plants
Taxonomy articles created by Polbot